Frank Parlato Jr. (born April 25, 1955) is an American publisher. He publishes the Frank Report, Artvoice and the Niagara Falls Reporter. Parlato is widely credited for bringing attention to the NXIVM cult when he published the article "Branded Slaves and Master Raniere" on June 5, 2017.

NXIVM Relationship and Federal Case
In 2007, Parlato was hired to work for NXIVM as a publicist. He was fired the following year, and went on to blog about NXIVM on his own website, the Frank Report. In 2019 he received wide media coverage for his efforts to bring down the NXIVM cult.

In 2015 Parlato was federally indicted on 19 counts, including fraud, money laundering and conspiracy related to his management of the One Niagara Center in Niagara Falls, New York. In 2018, prosecutors dropped the portion of the charges against him that related to defrauding Seagram's heirs.  

The Buffalo News, noting the changes in the US DOJ WDNY superseding indictment, reported that Seagram's heir Clare Bronfman went from the accuser in Parlato's case to the accused when she was arrested in 2018, noting also that Parlato broke major stories that led to her arrest.

Parlato and the US Government reached a plea deal on August 5, 2022.  Frank Parlato pleaded guilty to a single count of failure to file an IRS form in 2010 for the receipt of more than $10,000 in cash. Parlato is awaiting sentencing before US District Court Judge Richard Arcara.

The Frank Report 
The Frank Report began publishing blogs and stories on Nov. 30, 2015 – 10 days after Parlato was indicted. One of his first blogs on The Frank Report detailed Parlato's indictment, some of which were “fueled by Clare Bronfman & NXIVM’s legal team” after he left the cult. A common tactic NXIVM used was to go after defectors with an onslaught of civil & criminal charges, often smearing and bankrupting their targets which Frank was originally hired to be a part of.

The Frank report has published thousands of articles about NXIVM, DOS, Keith Raniere, and other issues including cults, criminal justice, and legal journalism.

NXIVM, DOS, and Cult Reporting 
In 2019, Parlato was the lead investigator and consulting producer of the two-hour Investigation Discovery documentary The Lost Women of NXIVM.

He appeared in five episodes of HBO's docuseries The Vow: "Building Character", "Class 1 Data", "Blame & Responsibility", "The Wound" and "The Fall". Parlato also appeared in episode four of Seduced: Inside the NXIVM Cult.

In both docuseries, Parlato is credited with helping women who the cult called "slaves" escape and ending the practice of human branding within the cult subgroup called DOS.

In the Starz TV docuseries Seduced, Inside the NXIVM Cult, India Oxenberg credits Parlato for preventing "slaves" from being branded and required to have sex with NXIVM leader Keith Raniere. In the final episode of Seduced, "Exposed", Oxenberg said, "As soon as the [Frank Report] posts started coming up, there were a ton of questions and a lot of chatter. My slaves left immediately after that. And none of them had to complete the seduction assignment or be branded. That was a huge relief."

Her mother, Catherine Oxenberg, who first revealed the existence of DOS to Parlato, confirmed that Parlato's stories prompted women to leave the group. In Seduced, she says that as a result of seeing Parlato's blog, "A lot of DOS slaves started to defect."

Catherine Oxenberg told Gretchen Carlson, on the Lifetime special Beyond the Headlines: Escaping the NXIVM Cult about Parlato's work to expose the group that branded and blackmailed women and whose leaders were convicted of racketeering, sex trafficking, state law extortion, and sexual exploitation of a minor: 

Several former leaders of DOS blame Parlato for destroying their sorority and the NXIVM community, blaming him for writing "distorted and highly-biased" stories based on the "skewed narrative" of a few whistleblowers, including Sarah Edmondson. Parlato's stories "effectively ended DOS. Everything ceased."

Actor Sam Rosenthal played Parlato in the A&E TV drama Escaping the NXIVM Cult: A Mother's Fight to Save Her Daughter in what was a fictionalized presentation based on the true story of Parlato's efforts to take down a vicious cult leader.

Other reporting
Prior to his investigative work on NXIVM, Parlato, through his publication the Niagara Falls Reporter, reported extensively on the no-bid contract that the Maid of the Mist Steamboat Company enjoyed while running boat cruises on the American and Canadian sides of the falls. He reported that the Niagara Parks Commission circumvented efforts by Ripley's Entertainment and Alcatraz Media from bidding on the boat tour concession while secretly approving a 25-year renewal of the Maid of the Mist Steamboat Company's license, while cutting its payment to the parks commission. In a series of articles, Parlato revealed that on the New York side, Maid of the Mist Steamboat Co. was operating rent free, and that the company tried to trademark the name 'Maid of the Mist' despite its use in tours and ferries since 1846.At one time, Parlato owned the One Niagra Building and took issue with having to pay taxes while the Seneca Nation, a sovereign tribe, did not. He accused Senecas of "sucking the life out of Niagra Falls". Parlato sold the building and moved on while the Seneca remained.

The stories were "hard-hitting and effected change". The Ontario Parliament ordered the Maid of the Mist lease canceled and the boat tour put out to tender. The result was a winning bid by Hornblower Tours that was $300 million higher than the Maid would have paid had its lease not been canceled.

Responding to critics who said he and his Niagara Falls Reporter publication had an unconventional style, Parlato told the Buffalo News, “We don’t follow anybody’s rules; we follow our own rules.”

Federal prosecution
Following a four year investigation, Parlato and business partner Chitra Selvaraj were federally indicted in the United States District Court for the Western District of New York in November 2015. Charges included fraud, money laundering, and tax evasion relating to Parlato's ownership and management of the One Niagara Building (former headquarters of Occidental Petroleum).

The matter was still in pretrial phase, with Parlato released on bond, when he was summoned by the federal court in Buffalo to appear November 2021 following an alleged incident in Florida. The event was investigated as a bail violation. The arrest warrant was rescinded, and the Court ordered Parlato undergo an anger management evaluation.

Parlato accepted a plea agreement in August, 2022, pleading guilty to the willful failure to file an IRS Form 8300 ( and ) when he accepted a cash rent payment of $19,000 from commercial tenants of the One Niagara Building. The agreement also requires him Parlato forfeit $1,000,000 originally seized during the investigation and to pay over $180,000 in restitution to the Internal Revenue Service. A sentencing date has been postponed several times, .

References

External links
The Frank Report

1955 births
Living people
NXIVM people
People from Buffalo, New York
American newspaper people